Standing NATO Maritime Group 2 (SNMG2) is a North Atlantic Treaty Organization (NATO) standing maritime immediate reaction force. SNMG2 consists of four to six destroyers and frigates. Its role is to provide NATO with an immediate operational response capability.

History

Standing Naval Force Mediterranean (STANAVFORMED) was activated on 30 April 1992, at Naples, Italy. STANAVFORMED was the successor to the NATO Naval On-Call Force Mediterranean (NAVOCFORMED) – which had been periodically activated for more than 20 years.

During the 1990s, STANAVFORMED was heavily involved in Operation Maritime Monitor (July 1992 to November 1992), Operation Maritime Guard (November 1992 to June 1993) and Operation Sharp Guard (June 1993 to October 1996), the maritime embargo operations in the Adriatic Sea established to ensure compliance by Serbia and Montenegro with United Nations (UN) resolutions 713, 715, 787, 820 and 943. Between November 1992 and June 1996 some 74,000 ships were challenged, almost 6,000 were inspected at sea and more than 1,400 were diverted and inspected in port.

On 6 October 2001, STANAVFORMED deployed to the Eastern Mediterranean Sea in support of Operation Active Endeavour, NATO's maritime contribution to prevent the movement of terrorists or weapons of mass destruction.

The force was re-designated Standing NATO Maritime Group 2 in January 2005.

From June 2009 to August 2009 SNMG2 was deployed by NATO off the Somali coast to conduct Operation Allied Protector, to deter, defend and protect World Food Programme (WFP) vessels against the threat of piracy and armed robbery, thereby allowing WFP to fulfill its mission of providing humanitarian aid.

Since August 2009, SNMG2 has been providing ships for NATO's Operation Ocean Shield anti-piracy mission in the Gulf of Aden.

In 2019, SNMG2 was tasked with patrol of the Mediterranean Sea and Black Sea. In 2021, SNMG2 took part in Exercise Sea Breeze 2021 in the Black Sea, co-hosted by the Ukrainian Navy and the United States Sixth Fleet.

Current ships
As of 16 February 2023, SNMG2 consists of:

Ships in bold are currently part of the naval force

Previous task groups
In 2022, SNMG2 consisted of:

Ships in bold are currently part of the naval force

In 2021, SNMG2 consisted of:

Organization
SNMG2 is a component of the NATO Response Force (NRF).

See also

Standing NATO Maritime Group 1
Standing NATO Mine Countermeasures Group 1
Standing NATO Mine Countermeasures Group 2

References

External links
 Official web page

Military units and formations of NATO